A119 may refer to:

 Project A119, "A Study of Lunar Research Flights," a plan developed by the United States Air Force
 AgustaWestland AW119, a helicopter
 RFA Wave Laird (A119), a ship
 A119 road (England), a road connecting Ware and Watton-at-Stone 
 A119 road (Malaysia), a road in Perak connecting Kampung Kuala Dipang and Tapah 
 A119 road (Russia), a road connecting Cheboksary and Syktyvkar